is a 1983 anime series by Nippon Animation. 48 episodes aired on Fuji TV.

It is based on the children's book Treasures of the Snow by Patricia St. John and set in the Swiss mountain village of Rossinière.

The anime is dubbed in other languages like French, German, Greek, Italian, Spanish, Persian, Hungarian, Polish, Portuguese and Arabic.

Cast
Keiko Han as Annette Burnier
Sanae Miyuki as Daniel Burnier
Eiko Yamada as Lucien Morel
Rihoko Yoshida as Marie Morel
Osamu Kobayashi as Pierre Burnier

The anime had one opening and one ending theme. The opening theme is "Annette no Aoi Sora" and the ending theme "Edelweiss no Shiroi Hana", both performed by Keiko Han (潘恵子).

Episode list

References

External links

1983 anime television series debuts
Drama anime and manga
Television shows set in Switzerland
World Masterpiece Theater series
Fuji TV original programming
Television series set in the 1900s